Lindstrøm & Prins Thomas is a musical collaboration between Norwegian producers Hans-Peter Lindstrøm and Prins Thomas.  Their style of music is often termed "space disco" with influences including electro, fusion, prog and krautrock.

Discography

Studio albums
Lindstrøm & Prins Thomas (2005)
Reinterpretations (2007)
II (2009)
III (2020)

Singles and EPs
"Further Into The Future" (2004)
"Turkish Delight" (2005)
"Mighty Girl" (2006)
"Boney M Down" (2006)
"Nummer Fire" (2007)
"Tirsdagsjam" (2009)

References

External links
Discography on allmusic.com
Discography on discogs.com

Norwegian electronic music groups
Norwegian disco groups
Science fiction music
Hi-NRG groups
Electronic music duos
Norwegian record producers
Musical groups with year of establishment missing 
Musical groups from Norway with local place of origin missing
Nu-disco musicians